Umar Isaevich Salamov (born 7 June 1994) is a Russian professional boxer who held the IBO light-heavyweight title in 2016.

Professional career
In May 2016, Salamov moved to Las Vegas, Nevada to start at a new training camp in Kevin Barry's gym. Barry is well known for training legendary boxers like David Tua, former WBA middleweight champion Maselino Masoe, three time world champion Beibut Shumenov and former IBF junior-lightweight champion Robbie Peden. Barry is training Salamov alongside Izu Ugonoh and former WBO heavyweight champion Joseph Parker.

Salamov vs. Anim 
On 1 December, 2018, Salamov beat Emmanuel Anim by unanimous decision in their 10 round contest. The scorecards read 98-92, 97-93, 99-91 in favor of Salamov.

Salamov vs. Danso 
On 19 September, 2019, Salamov fought and beat Emmanuel Danso by knockout in the 3rd round.

Salamov vs. Bivol 
Salamov fought Dmitry Bivol on 11 December, 2021, or the WBA light heavyweight championship of the world. Bivol was ranked as the #2 light heavyweight in the world according to The Ring magazine. Bivol won the fight by unanimous decision in their 12 round contest with the scorecards being 119-109, 118-109, 118-110 in Bivol's favor.

Professional titles held
International Boxing Organization 
Youth World Light Heavyweight title (2013)
World Light Heavyweight title (2016)
World Boxing Organisation 
Youth World Light Heavyweight title (2014)
WBO European Light Heavyweight title (2014)
WBO International light heavyweight title (2017)
International Boxing Federation 
IBF East/West Europe light heavyweight title (2017)

Professional boxing record

References

External links

Umar Salamov - Profile, News Archive & Current Rankings at Box.Live

Boxers trained by Kevin Barry
Living people
1994 births
Light-heavyweight boxers
Russian male boxers
Russian people of Chechen descent